Boloor is a locality in the western part of Mangalore city of Karnataka state in India. Industries such as Hindustan Unilever are situated at Boloor.

References

Localities in Mangalore